The 2010–11 Florida State Seminoles men's basketball team represented Florida State University during the 2010–11 NCAA Division I men's basketball season. The Seminoles, led by 9th year head coach Leonard Hamilton, played their home games at the Donald L. Tucker Center and were members of the Atlantic Coast Conference.

The Seminoles finished the season 23–11, 11–5 in ACC play and lost in the quarterfinals of the 2011 ACC men's basketball tournament to Virginia Tech. They received an at-large bid in the 2011 NCAA Division I men's basketball tournament where they defeated Texas A&M in the second round and Notre Dame in the third round to advance to the Sweet Sixteen where they were defeated by Virginia Commonwealth.

Roster

Schedule

|-
!colspan=9 style="background:#; color:white;"| Exhibition

|-
!colspan=9 style="background:#; color:white;"| Regular season

|-
!colspan=9 style="background:#; color:white;"| ACC tournament

|-
!colspan=9 style="background:#; color:white;"| NCAA tournament

References

External links
Almanac
Statistics

Florida State
Florida State
Florida State Seminoles men's basketball seasons